Young-wook (various spellings) is a Korean masculine given name. Its meaning differs based on the hanja used to write each syllable of the name. There are 33 hanja with the reading "young" and 11 hanja with the reading "wook" on the South Korean government's official list of hanja which may be registered for use in given names.

People with this name include:
Jo Yeong-wook (born 1962), South Korean film music composer
Yung Wook Yoo (born 1977), South Korean pianist
Lee Young-uk (born 1980), South Korean baseball pitcher
Lee Young-wook (born 1985), South Korean baseball outfielder
Cho Young-wook (born 1999), South Korean football forward

See also
List of Korean given names

References

Korean masculine given names